United Nations Security Council resolution 464, adopted unanimously on 19 February 1980, after examining the application of Saint Vincent and the Grenadines for membership in the United Nations, the Council recommended to the General Assembly that Saint Vincent and the Grenadines be admitted.

See also
 Member states of the United Nations
 List of United Nations Security Council Resolutions 401 to 500 (1976–1982)

References
Text of the Resolution at undocs.org

External links
 

 0464
 0464
 0464
February 1980 events
1980 in Saint Vincent and the Grenadines